Terry Becker (August 5, 1921 – December 30, 2014) was an American film and television actor, director and producer.

Career 
Becker portrayed Chief Francis Ethelbert Sharkey in seasons 2 through 4 of the television series Voyage to the Bottom of the Sea. Becker took the role after the death of actor Henry Kulky, who had played the submarine's Chief (Curly Jones) during the first season of the series. Becker also made two guest appearances on Perry Mason. In 1958 he played murder victim Philip Larkin in "The Case of the Prodigal Parent", and in 1960 he played Prosecuting Attorney Everett Ransome in "The Case of the Violent Village."

Becker's work behind the camera began with the TV series Room 222, on which he was associate producer.  He also directed eight episodes of the series.  Becker went on to directing assignments on many other TV series, including Mission: Impossible, M*A*S*H, Love, American Style, The Brady Bunch and others, plus a motion picture, The Thirsty Dead, which he also produced.  In 1973, he partnered with actor Carroll O'Connor to form O'Connor-Becker Productions.  In 1983, the partnership split up and Becker continued producing as a solo producer under his own Becker Productions and Becker Enterprises banners.

Partial filmography as actor
 Danger (1951-1952, TV Series) .... Lou
 Short Short Dramas (1953, TV Series)
 Teacher's Pet (1958) .... Mr. Appino (uncredited)
 The Fiend Who Walked the West (1958) .... Lew Lane (uncredited)
 Compulsion (1959) .... Benson, Angry Reporter (uncredited)
 Wanted Dead or Alive (1960, TV Series) .... Deputy Fred Kimball (billed as Adam Becker)
 Perry Mason (1958-1960, TV Series) .... Everett Ransome / Philip Larkin
 Gunsmoke (1960) .... Emmett
 Code of Silence (1960) .... Mike Story
 The Asphalt Jungle (1961, TV Series) .... Ira Fallon
 Sea Hunt (1961, TV Series) .... Putnam's Agent / Alcott - Newspaper Reporter
 Combat! (1963, TV Series), Season 2 Episode:15 "The Party"  .... / Sgt Claybourne
 The Twilight Zone (1964, TV Series, Episode: "I Am the Night Color Me Black") .... Jagger
 Rawhide (1959-1964, TV Series) .... Burt / Seth Warner
 Voyage to the Bottom of the Sea (1965-1968, TV Series, Main Character) .... Chief Francis Ethelbert Sharkey
 The Writer (2004) .... Dr. Norman Solomon
 Neighborhood Watch (2005) .... Judd Sowell
 Finishing the Game (2007) .... Breeze's Dad
 In Case of Emergency (2007, TV Series Episode: "Disorder in the Court") .... Judge
 Infection: The Invasion Begins (2010) .... Grandpa Sy (final film role)

Partial filmography as producer-director
 The Thirsty Dead, motion picture, producer-director, 1974
 Bronk, executive producer  TV series 1975-76
 Hallmark Hall of Fame The Last Hurrah, TV movie, executive producer, 1977  
 Bender, TV series, executive producer, 1979
 Riding for the Pony Express, TV movie, producer, 1980 
 Archie Bunker's Place, TV series, 1979-83 O'Connor-Becker Company 
 Savage in the Orient, TV movie- TV series pilot, executive producer 1983 
 Blade in Hong Kong, TV movie, producer, 1985 
 Room 222, associate producer 26 episodes 1969-70 
 Room 222, TV series, director 8 episodes 1969-71 
 The Courtship of Eddie's Father, TV series, director, 1970
 The Mod Squad, TV series, director, 1970
 Love, American Style, TV series, director, 1970–72
 The Brady Bunch, TV series, director, 1971
 Mission: Impossible, TV series, director, 1970–72
 M*A*S*H, TV series, director 1972

References

External links
 
 
 Obituary
 Find a Grave

American male film actors
American male television actors
Male actors from New York City
Jewish American male actors
People from the Bronx
1921 births
2014 deaths
20th-century American male actors
21st-century American male actors
Film directors from New York City
21st-century American Jews
Burials at Eden Memorial Park Cemetery